Lars Widenfalk (born 31 July 1954) is a Swedish artist who works as a sculptor in Sweden, the Czech Republic and Italy. He is considered to have helped renewed figurative expression in Nordic sculpture. He works with many materials, from bronze, snow and ice. But his main material is stone, usually marble and granite. In recent years, he has also worked with glass. He is married to the Czech artist Alena Matejka.<ref name="Yman2012">Yman, Bosse. Lars Widenfalk skulptör utan gränser Magasinet Herjedalen. Vinter/vår 2012.</ref>

 Education 
Widenfalk was born in Sveg, Härjedalen, Sweden.

He studied Archaeology and Art History at Uppsala University, Sweden. Later, he studied at the Norwegian National Academy of Fine Arts in Oslo (1982–85) focusing on the three dimensional work. He chose Oslo due to a desire to work with figurative sculptures.

 Work 
Lars Widenfalk has been involved in several projects in the three-dimensional expression, often in collaboration with his wife Alena Matejka. She is educated in the Czech Bohemian glass tradition. It was she who introduced him to the crystal glass, a material he often uses in combination with stone.

His imagery is figurative. His early works were often realistic and figurative. But this has changed to sculptures with symbolic and soulish expression. Many of his works center around the theme of place and people. For example his work on the room or the house, is usually open with simple geometric shapes. Marked only by four corner columns and a roof. Usually a full-length human or a human head is located in the house. He has also built several large aquariums, where he puts his sculptures along with living fish. In water the stone's color becomes much more intense.

One of his major works are the black violin, Blackbird, made from stone after drawings by Antonio Stradivari (Stradivarius), but with some technical adjustments in order to play. The violin is made of diabase (dolerite), a rock that was left over from his grandfather's tombstone. At its thinnest the stone is just 2.5 mm thick. The thin walls of the resonance box was contour cut with water and then machined with hand tools. It took two years to make the violin.Kalsi, Jyoti. As a work of art it is unique. Gulf News. (tabloid) February 1, 2005.

An installation Cross My Heart, St. Agostino, Pietrasanta, Italy, in 2011, consisted of twelve rather like sculptures of maidens with their arms crossed over the chest, made of white marble. A similar sculpture of a woman with arms crossed, is Listen to Your Heart, a granite sculpture with a height of 260 cm.

He has had numerous exhibitions, most in Sweden, but several abroad, mainly in Norway, Denmark, Czech Republic and Italy. Lars Widenfalk is represented in various collections, including the Swedish State Art Council, Göteborgs Art museum, Sundsvalls Museum and House of Parliament in Sweden. Also Norwegian Arts Council and Contemporary Modern Museum in Norway.

Notes and references

 Literature  
 Caine, Alen. Masters and Emerging Sculptors from Studio Sem, Pietrasanta. Page 9-43.
 Forsberg, Carl. Less is more. Sculpture Review. Vol LV. No.3 2006. Page 32-37. (USA)
 Kalsi, Jyoti. As a work of art it is unique. Gulf News. (tabloid) 1. februari 2005. Page 5. (Dubai)
 Pettersson, Jan Åke. Katalogtext för utställing på Brandts Klaedefabrik, Town Art Hall. Odense, Danmark 1989. Tovik, Arne. Reiste seg etter hærverket. Varden. Kultur. 5. juni 2005. Skien/Oslo. 2005. Page 42. (Norway)
 Stephens, C.S. Kawaguchi Public Art. 2003. Page 41. (Japan)
 Yman, Bosse. Lars Widenfalk skulptör utan gränser''. Magasinet Herjedalen. Vinter/vår 2012. Page 62-69. pdf

External links
 Lars Widenfalk – homepage
 Face II Face – Lars Holm and Lars Widenfalk –  Art exhibition in Linneanum, Botanical Garden, Uppsala 2009
 Blackbird the Black Stone Violin  – The volinist Guo Jia Yin play on the stoneviolin

1954 births
Swedish male sculptors
Living people